Thomas G. Palumbo (June 9, 1950 in Newburyport, Massachusetts – August 18, 2011 in Salisbury, Massachusetts) was an American  politician who represented the 2nd Essex district in the Massachusetts House of Representatives from 1985 to 1995.

Palumbo was defeated by Harriett Stanley in the 1994 election. One month after his defeat, Palumbo was nominated by Governor William Weld to serve on the state Parole Board. He withdrew his nomination on January 4, 1995.

References

1950 births
2011 deaths
Republican Party members of the Massachusetts House of Representatives
Temple University alumni
Suffolk University Law School alumni
Politicians from Newburyport, Massachusetts
People from Salisbury, Massachusetts